Shia Wa Se  is a 2016 Taiwanese comedy, romance television series. It is adaptation from one of nominated drama script on the 4th Television Scriptwriting Awards held by Ministry of Culture. Starring Bobby Dou, Mariko Okubo, Phoebe Huang and Lo Pei-An as the main cast. Filming began on December 10, 2014 and wrapped up on March 23, 2015. First original broadcast began on January 29, 2016 on TTV airing every Friday night at 10:00–11:30 pm.

This drama was originally plan for total of 18 episodes but cut 4 episodes to total of 14 episodes after that.

Synopsis 
Matsuzaka Bistro is a hot diner in Taiwan where people go for great homemade food and the welcoming atmosphere of a loving family that owns it. But it could all be a hoax! The sweet parents and their enthusiastic son and daughter are not even related to each other. The strangers met by coincidence when they each needed a new start in life and decided to become a family in order to open the restaurant. But is a true family born or made?

Cast

Main cast
 竇智孔 as Ji Run Hua 紀潤華
Mariko Okubo as Matsuzaka Nanami / Song Ban Qi Hai (in Chinese) 松坂七海
 黃嘉千 as Cai Yun Qiu 蔡雲雀
 羅北安 as Jiang Yi Lang 江一郎

Supporting cast
 吳心緹 as Yui Yang
 素珠 as Yun Qiu's Grandma
Tsai Chen-nan as Li Huo Tai 李火泰
 林美照 as Kang De's mother
Figaro Tseng 曾少宗 as Li Kang De 李康德
 吳定謙 as Ah Qiang 阿强
 潘慧如 as Xiao Hui 小卉
Ko I-chen 柯一正 as Qi Hai's father 
Takiko Nakamura 中村多喜子 as Hui Zi 惠子（Keiko）
 張倩 as Fu Li Ping 傅麗萍（PoPo）

Cameos
Wu Nien-jen as himself
Anna Aoi A'N'D-安娜 as waitress
 許騰方 as Xiao Liu 小劉
Jian Ha Zhong 簡漢宗 as Yi Lang's ex-boss
 邱彥翔 as Peng Yan Da (Old Peng) 彭彥達（老彭）
 安伯政 as Li family's younger brother
?? as Yui's father
?? as Yui's stepmother
Zheng Wei Hong 鄭偉宏

Soundtrack
No Longer Alone 不再怕寂寞 by Pets Tseng 曾沛慈
Single 一個人 by William Wei 韋禮安
Love, Waiting 留給你的愛 by Fang Wu 吳汶芳
You Were Meant for Me 最美的等候 by Claire Kuo 郭靜
Playing Games 玩遊戲 by William Wei 韋禮安
Mask 面具 by William Wei 韋禮安

Broadcast

Episode ratings
Competing dramas on rival channels airing at the same time slot were:
FTV – Justice Heroes, My Teacher Is Xiao-he
SET Metro – Back to 1989
SET Taiwan – La Grande Chaumiere Violette

References

External links
Shia Wa Se TTV Website 
Shia Wa Se TVBS Website  
 

2016 Taiwanese television series debuts
2016 Taiwanese television series endings
Taiwan Television original programming
TVBS original programming